Annie Thérèse Blanche Ernaux (born 1 September 1940) is a French writer who was awarded the 2022 Nobel Prize in Literature "for the courage and clinical acuity with which she uncovers the roots, estrangements and collective restraints of personal memory". Her literary work, mostly autobiographical, maintains close links with sociology.

Early life and education 
Ernaux was born in Lillebonne in Normandy and grew up in nearby Yvetot, where her parents, Blanche (Dumenil) and Alphonse Duchesne, ran a café and grocery in a working-class part of town. In 1960 she travelled to London where she worked as an au pair, an experience she would later relate in 2016's Mémoire de fille (A Girl's Story). Upon returning to France, she studied at the universities of Rouen and then Bordeaux, qualified as a schoolteacher, and earned a higher degree in modern literature in 1971. She worked for a time on a thesis project, unfinished, on Pierre de Marivaux.

In the early 1970s, Ernaux taught at a lycée in Bonneville, Haute-Savoie, at the college of Évire in Annecy-le-Vieux, then in Pontoise, before joining the National Centre for Distance Education, where she was employed for 23 years.

Literary career 
Ernaux started her literary career in 1974 with Les Armoires vides (Cleaned Out), an autobiographical novel. In 1984, she won the Renaudot Prize for another of her works La Place (A Man's Place), an autobiographical narrative focusing on her relationship with her father and her experiences growing up in a small town in France, and her subsequent process of moving into adulthood and away from her parents' place of origin.

Early in her career, Ernaux turned from fiction to focus on autobiography. Her work combines historic and individual experiences. She charts her parents' social progression (La place, La honte), her teenage years (Ce qu'ils disent ou rien), her marriage (La femme gelée), her passionate affair with an Eastern European man (Passion simple), her abortion (L'événement), Alzheimer's disease (Je ne suis pas sortie de ma nuit), the death of her mother (Une femme), and breast cancer (L'usage de la photo). Ernaux also wrote L'écriture comme un couteau (Writing as Sharp as a Knife) with Frédéric-Yves Jeannet.

A Woman's Story, A Man's Place, and Simple Passion were recognised as The New York Times Notable Books, and A Woman's Story was a finalist for the Los Angeles Times Book Prize. Shame was named a Publishers Weekly Best Book of 1998, I Remain in Darkness a Top Memoir of 1999 by The Washington Post, and The Possession was listed as a Top Ten Book of 2008 by More magazine.

Ernaux's 2008 historical memoir Les Années (The Years), well received by French critics, is considered by many to be her magnum opus. In this book, Ernaux writes about herself in the third person ('elle', or 'she' in English) for the first time, providing a vivid look at French society just after the Second World War until the early 2000s. It is the story of a woman and of the evolving society she lived in. The Years won the 2008 , the 2008 Marguerite Duras Prize, the 2008 Prix de la langue française, the 2009 Télégramme Readers Prize, and the 2016 Strega European Prize. Translated by Alison L. Strayer, The Years was a finalist for the 31st Annual French-American Foundation Translation Prize, was nominated for the International Booker Prize in 2019, and won the 2019 Warwick Prize for Women in Translation. Her popularity in anglophone countries increased sharply after The Years was shortlisted for the International Booker.

On 6 October 2022, it was announced that Ernaux would be awarded the 2022 Nobel Prize in Literature "for the courage and clinical acuity with which she uncovers the roots, estrangements and collective restraints of personal memory". Ernaux is the 16th French writer, and the first Frenchwoman, to receive the literature prize. In congratulating her, the president of France, Emmanuel Macron, said that she was the voice "of the freedom of women and of the forgotten".

Many of Ernaux's works have been translated into English and published by Seven Stories Press. Ernaux is one of the seven founding authors from whom the Press takes its name.

Political activism 

 Wiki people 

Ernaux supported Jean-Luc Mélenchon in the 2012 French presidential election. In 2018, Ernaux expressed her support for the yellow vests protests.

Ernaux has repeatedly indicated her support for the BDS movement, a Palestinian-led campaign promoting boycott, divestment and sanctions against Israel. In 2018, the author signed a letter alongside about 80 other artists that opposed the holding of the Israel–France cross-cultural season by the Israeli and French governments. In 2019, Ernaux signed a letter calling on a French state-owned broadcasting network not to air the Eurovision Song Contest, which was held in Israel that year. In 2021, after the Operation Guardian of the Walls, she signed another letter that called Israel an apartheid state, claiming that "To frame this as a war between two equal sides is false and misleading. Israel is the colonizing power. Palestine is colonized."

Ernaux signed a letter that supported the release of Georges Abdallah, who was sentenced to life imprisonment in 1982 for the assassination of an American military attaché, Lt. Col. Charles R. Ray, and an Israeli diplomat, Yacov Barsimantov. According to the letter, the victims were "active Mossad and CIA agents, while Abdallah fought for the Palestinian people and against colonization".

Following the announcement of the award of the Nobel Prize, Ernaux showed solidarity with people's uprising in Iran against their government. The protests that followed the death of a young woman in the custody of Guidance Patrol (Morality Police) initially started against compulsory hijab law in Iran but soon took a broader focus on liberty. Ernaux said in an interview she was "absolutely in favour of women revolting against this absolute constraint".

Personal life 
Ernaux was previously married to Philippe Ernaux, with whom she has two sons. The couple divorced in the early 1980s.

She has been a resident of Cergy-Pontoise, a new town in the Paris suburbs, since the mid-1970s.

Works 
 Les Armoires vides, Paris, Gallimard, 1974; Gallimard, 1984, 
 
 Ce qu'ils disent ou rien, Paris, Gallimard, 1977; French & European Publications, Incorporated, 1989, 
 
 La Femme gelée, Paris, Gallimard, 1981; French & European Publications, Incorporated, 1987, 
 
 La Place, Paris, Gallimard, 1983; Distribooks Inc, 1992, 
 
 
 Une Femme, Paris, Gallimard, 1987
 
 Passion simple, Paris, Gallimard, 1991; Gallimard, 1993, 
 
 Journal du dehors, Paris, Gallimard, 1993
 
 La Honte, Paris, Gallimard, 1997
 Shame, Translator Tanya Leslie, Seven Stories Press, 1998, 
 Je ne suis pas sortie de ma nuit, Paris, Gallimard, 1997
 
 La Vie extérieure : 1993–1999, Paris, Gallimard, 2000
 
 L'Événement, Paris, Gallimard, 2000, 
 
 Se perdre, Paris, Gallimard, 2001
 Getting Lost, Translator Allison L. Strayer, Seven Stories Press, 2022
 L'Occupation, Paris, Gallimard, 2002
 
 L'Usage de la photo, with Marc Marie, Paris, Gallimard, 2005
 Les Années, Paris, Gallimard, 2008, 
 
 L'Autre fille, Paris, Nil 2011 
 L'Atelier noir, Paris, éditions des Busclats, 2011
 Écrire la vie, Paris, Gallimard, 2011
 Retour à Yvetot, éditions du Mauconduit, 2013
 Regarde les lumières mon amour, Seuil, 2014
 
 Mémoire de fille, Gallimard, 2016
 
 Hôtel Casanova, Gallimard Folio, 2020
 Le jeune homme, Gallimard, 2022

Adaptations 
In addition to numerous theatrical and radio adaptations, Ernaux's novels have been adapted for the cinema on three occasions:

 L'Événement (2021), released in English as Happening and directed by Audrey Diwan, received the Golden Lion at the 2021 Venice Film Festival.
 Passion simple (2020; English title: Simple Passion) was directed by Danielle Arbid. It was selected to be shown at that year's Cannes Film Festival.
 L'Autre (2008), based on L'Occupation and titled The Other One in English.

Awards and distinctions 
 1977 Prix d'Honneur for  Ce qu'ils disent ou rien
 1984 Prix Renaudot for La Place
 2008 Prix Marguerite-Duras for Les Années
 2008 Prix François-Mauriac for Les Années
 2008 Prix de la langue française for the entirety of her oeuvre
 2014 Doctor honoris causa of Cergy-Pontoise University
 2016 Strega European Prize for The Years (translated into Italian as Gli Anni) (L'Orma)
 2017 Prix Marguerite Yourcenar, awarded by the Civil Society of Multimedia Authors, for the entirety of her oeuvre
 2018 Premio Hemingway per la letteratura for the entirety of her oeuvre
 2019 Prix Formentor
 2019 Premio Gregor von Rezzori for Una Donna (Une Femme)
 2019 Shortlisted for the International Booker Prize for The Years
 2021 Elected a Royal Society of Literature International Writer
 2022 Nobel Prize in Literature

The , of which she is the "godmother", bears her name.

References

Further reading 
 Loraine Day: Writing Shame and Desire: The Work of Annie Ernaux; Peter Lang, 2007
 Alison Fell: Ernaux: La Place and La Honte; Grant and Cutler, Critical Guides to French Studies, 2006. 
 Alison Fell and Edward Welch: 'Annie Ernaux: Socio-Ethnographer of Contemporary France' Nottingham French Studies, June 2009. 
 Pierre-Louis Fort (ed): L'Herne: Annie Ernaux; L'Herne, 2022. 
 Elise Hugueny-Léger: Annie Ernaux, une poétique de la transgression; Peter Lang, 2009. 
 Siobhán McIlvanney: Annie Ernaux, The Return to Origins; Liverpool University Press, 2001. 
 Lyn Thomas: Annie Ernaux: An Introduction to the Writer and her Audience; Berg, 1999.
 Lyn Thomas: Annie Ernaux, à la première personne; Stock, 2005.
 Lyn Thomas: 'Voix blanche? Annie Ernaux, French feminisms and the challenge of intersectionality' in M. Atack, A. Fell, D.Holmes and I. Long (eds) Making Waves: French Feminisms and their Legacies 1975–2015; Liverpool University Press, 2019, p. 201–214.
 S. J. McIlvanney: Gendering mimesis. Realism and feminism in the works of Annie Ernaux and Claire Etcherelli. Graduate thesis, University of Oxford 1994 
 Sarah Elizabeth Cant: Self-referentiality and the works of Annie Ernaux, Patrick Modiano, and Daniel Pennac. Thesis, University of Oxford 2000  
 Georges Gaillard: Traumatisme, solitude et auto-engendrement. Annie Ernaux: "L'événement". Filigrane, écoutes psychothérapiques, 15, 1. Montréal, Spring 2006  en ligne;   p. 67–86.

External links 

  
 Critical bibliography (Auteurs.contemporain.info) 
 
 

1940 births
20th-century French novelists
20th-century French women writers
21st-century French novelists
21st-century French women writers
Anti-Zionism in France
French Nobel laureates
French women novelists
French Communist writers
Living people
Nobel laureates in Literature
People from Lillebonne
French socialists
French socialist feminists
French feminist writers
Prix Renaudot winners
Women Nobel laureates
University of Bordeaux alumni
University of Rouen Normandy alumni